The Diocese of Biloxi is a Latin Church ecclesiastical territory or diocese of the Catholic Church that encompasses 17 counties in south Mississippi. It was erected on March 1, 1977, when it was split from the Roman Catholic Diocese of Jackson. The Diocese of Biloxi is a suffragan diocese the  ecclesiastical province of the metropolitan Archdiocese of Mobile, though for its first three years the diocese was in the province of the Archdiocese of New Orleans.

The Cathedral of the Nativity of the Blessed Virgin Mary, in Biloxi, Mississippi, is the diocese's cathedral.

History
Pope Paul VI erected the Diocese of Biloxi, with territory taken from the Diocese of Natches-Jackson on 1 March 1977.

On 29 July 1980, Pope John Paul II elevated the Diocese of Mobile to a metropolitan archdiocese and designated the Diocese of Biloxi as a suffragan of the new metropolitan see.

On December 16, 2016, the Vatican announced that Pope Francis had accepted Bishop Roger Morin's resignation and appointed Louis Kihneman III, Vicar General of the Diocese of Corpus Christi, Texas, as Morin's successor.

Bishops

Bishops of Biloxi
 Joseph Lawson Howze (1977–2001)
 Thomas John Rodi (2001–2008), appointed Archbishop of Mobile
 Roger Morin (2009–2016)
 Louis Frederick Kihneman (2017–present)

Other priest of this diocese who became bishop
 Ronald Paul Herzog, appointed Bishop of Alexandria in 2004

High schools
 Our Lady Academy, Bay St. Louis
 Resurrection High School, Pascagoula
 Sacred Heart High School, Hattiesburg
 St. Patrick Catholic High School, Biloxi
 Saint Stanislaus College, Bay St. Louis

Closed schools:
 Mercy Cross High School*, Biloxi
 St. John High School*, Gulfport
 * Closed in 2007 and replaced by St. Patrick Catholic High School.

See also

 Catholic Church by country
 Catholic Church hierarchy
 List of the Catholic dioceses of the United States

References

 Catholic Hierarchy – Diocese of Biloxi

External links
Roman Catholic Diocese of Biloxi Official Site
 Cathedral of the Nativity of the Blessed Virgin Mary

 
1977 establishments in Mississippi
Christian organizations established in 1977
Catholic Church in Mississippi
Biloxi
Biloxi